Rasm Al-Ahmar  is a Syrian village located in Al-Saan Subdistrict, Salamiyah District, Hama.  According to the Syria Central Bureau of Statistics (CBS), Rasm Al-Ahmar had a population of 754 in the 2004 census.

References 

Populated places in Salamiyah District